Leinster Airport  is an airport in Leinster, Western Australia.

Airlines and destinations

References

External links
Airservices Aerodromes & Procedure Charts

Airports in Western Australia